This is a list of diplomatic missions of Thailand, excluding honorary consulates.

Africa

 Cairo (Embassy)

 Nairobi (Embassy)

Tripoli (Embassy)

 Antananarivo (Consulate-General)

 Rabat (Embassy)

 Maputo (Embassy)

 Abuja (Embassy)

 Dakar (Embassy)

 Pretoria (Embassy)

Americas

 Buenos Aires (Embassy)

 Brasília (Embassy)

 Ottawa (Embassy)
 Vancouver (Consulate-General)

 Santiago (Embassy)

 Mexico City (Embassy)

 Lima (Embassy)

 Washington, D.C. (Embassy)
 Chicago (Consulate-General)
 Los Angeles (Consulate-General)
 New York City (Consulate-General)

Asia

 Manama (Embassy)

 Dhaka (Embassy)

 Bandar Seri Begawan (Embassy)

 Phnom Penh (Embassy)

 Beijing (Embassy)
 Chengdu (Consulate-General)
 Guangzhou (Consulate-General)
 Hong Kong (Consulate-General)
 Kunming (Consulate-General)
 Nanning (Consulate-General)
 Qingdao (Consulate-General)
 Shanghai (Consulate-General)
 Xiamen (Consulate-General)
 Xi'an (Consulate-General)

 Dili (Embassy)

 New Delhi (Embassy)
 Chennai (Consulate General)
 Kolkata (Consulate-General)
 Mumbai (Consulate-General)

 Jakarta (Embassy)

 Tehran (Embassy)

 Tel Aviv (Embassy)

 Tokyo (Embassy)
 Osaka (Consulate-General)
 Fukuoka (Consulate-General)

 Amman (Embassy)

 Astana (Embassy)

 Kuwait City (Embassy)

 Vientiane (Embassy)
 Savannakhet (Consulate-General)

 Kuala Lumpur (Embassy)
 George Town (Consulate-General)
 Kota Bharu (Consulate-General)

 Yangon (Embassy)

 Kathmandu (Embassy)

 Muscat (Embassy)

 Islamabad (Embassy)
 Karachi (Consulate-General)

 Manila (Embassy)

 Doha (Embassy)

 Riyadh (Embassy)
 Jeddah (Consulate-General)

 Singapore (Embassy)

 Seoul (Embassy)

 Colombo (Embassy)

 Taipei (Thailand Trade and Economic Office)

 Ankara (Embassy)

 Abu Dhabi (Embassy)
 Dubai (Consulate-General)

 Hanoi (Embassy)
 Ho Chi Minh City (Consulate-General)

Europe

 Vienna (Embassy)

 Brussels (Embassy)

 Prague (Embassy)

 Copenhagen (Embassy)

 Helsinki (Embassy)

 Paris (Embassy)

 Berlin (Embassy)
 Bonn (Embassy extension office)
 Frankfurt (Consulate-General)
 Munich (Consulate-General)

 Athens (Embassy)

 Budapest (Embassy)

 Rome (Embassy)

 The Hague (Embassy)

 Oslo (Embassy)

 Warsaw (Embassy)

 Lisbon (Embassy)

 Bucharest (Embassy)

 Moscow (Embassy)

 Madrid (Embassy)

 Stockholm (Embassy)

 Bern (Embassy)

 London (Embassy)

Oceania

 Canberra (Embassy)
 Sydney (Consulate-General)

 Wellington (Embassy)

Multilateral organizations
 
Jakarta (Permanent Mission)
 
Brussels (Mission)
 
Paris (Permanent Mission)
 
New York City (Permanent Mission)
Geneva (Permanent Mission to the United Nations Office and other international organizations)
Vienna (Permanent Mission to the United Nations Office and other international organizations)

Gallery

Non-resident ambassadors

  (Athens)
  (Paris)
  (Islamabad)
  (Pretoria)
  (Ottawa)
  (Ankara)
  (Washington, D.C.)
  (Brasilia)
  (Moscow)
  (Mexico City)
  (Abuja)
  (Lima)
  (Budapest)
  (Pretoria)
  (Dakar)
  (Nairobi)
  (Bucharest)
  (Abuja)
  (Dakar)
  (Abuja)
  (Tripoli)
  (Lima)
  (Maputo)
  (Wellington)
  (Abuja)
  (Santiago)
  (Budapest)
  (Ottawa)
  (Abuja)
  (Ottawa)
  (Ottawa)
  (Lima)
  (Santiago)
  (Abuja)
  (Helsinki)
  (Nairobi)
  (Cairo)
  (Pretoria)
  (Wellington)
  (Abuja)
  (Abuja)
  (Dakar)
  (Ankara)
  (Brasilia)
  (Dakar)
  (Mexico City)
  (Dakar)
  (New York City)
  (Mexico City)
  (Copenhagen)
  (London)
  (Dakar)
  (Amman)
  (Ottawa)
  (Rome)
  (Wellington)
  (Astana)
  (Helsinki)
  (Amman)
  (Pretoria)
  (Dakar)
  (Helsinki)
  (Maputo)
  (Colombo)
  (Nairobi)
  (New York City)
  (Dakar)
  (Rabat)
  (Beijing)
  (Maputo)
  (Paris)
  (Beijing)
  (Athens)
  (New York City)
  (Mexico City)
  (Abuja)
  (Budapest)
  (Beijing)
  (Amman)
  (Manila)
  (Santiago)
  (Buenos Aires)
  (Nairobi)
  (Rome)
  (Wellington)
  (Budapest)
  (Canberra)
  (Abuja)
  (Brasilia)
  (Brasilia)
  (Nairobi) 
  (Dakar)
  (Vienna)
  (Budapest)
  (Cairo)
  (Nairobi)
  (Amman)
  (Islamabad)
  (Nairobi)
  (Abuja)
  (Wellington)
  (Brasilia)
  (Rome)
  (Tehran)
  (New York City)
  (Nairobi)
  (Buenos Aires)
  (Moscow)
  (Port Moresby)
  (Lima)
  (Muscat)
  (Pretoria)
  (Pretoria)

Flags
Thailand is one of the two countries, the other being the United Kingdom, that uses diplomatic flags abroad.

See also
 List of diplomatic missions in Thailand
 Foreign relations of Thailand
 Visa policy of Thailand
 List of current ambassadors of Thailand

References

 Ministry of Foreign Affairs of Thailand
 Maps & Addresses of Thai Embassies globally

Thailand
Diplomatic missions